The American Legion Hut in Edmond, Oklahoma was built in 1937. It has been deemed significant as an example of Works Progress Administration economic activity in Edmond, as it provided employment for 12 workers for six months during the Depression), and for its WPA architecture with Craftsman influence.  It is also known as Edmond American Legion Hut and served historically as a meeting hall.

It was listed on the National Register of Historic Places in 1993.

References

American Legion buildings
Buildings and structures completed in 1937
Buildings and structures in Oklahoma County, Oklahoma
WPA Rustic architecture
Edmond, Oklahoma
Clubhouses on the National Register of Historic Places in Oklahoma
Works Progress Administration in Oklahoma
1937 establishments in Oklahoma
National Register of Historic Places in Oklahoma County, Oklahoma